"The Hundred Days of the Dragon" is an episode of the original The Outer Limits television show. It first aired on 23 September 1963, during the first season.

Introduction
An Asian government develops a reliable means of changing a person's physical appearance and fingerprints, and uses it to replace a U.S. presidential candidate with his double.

Opening narration

Plot
An undisclosed Asian government, presumably Mao Zedong's Communist China, based upon the description in the opening narration, plans to take over America by infiltrating and substituting officials at the White House. During the presidential campaign, William Lyons Selby, the candidate predicted to win the presidential election, is murdered and replaced by a lookalike, a doppelgänger. Selby is indeed elected, and the impostor assumes the office of President of the United States.

Though he fools the nation at large during his first few months in office, his daughter, Carol, soon begins to suspect that the man in the White House is not her father. Carol observes that Selby remembers dates and other publicly available information, but forgets private information, such as his food preferences and details of her husband's research projects. She voices her concerns to the Vice President, Ted Pearson, who disbelieves her, at first, until he is targeted for replacement by an assassin who breaks into his residence, is discovered lying in wait, and is chased off before he can effect the replacement, he being already in the guise of Pearson, which Pearson observes in disbelief.

Carol's husband, a physician and medical researcher, recalls that a peer-reviewed scientific journal disclosed Soviet experiments wherein a hominid animal's soft tissue had been successfully altered, and he speculated that the "serum" which was employed had been advanced significantly beyond that which was previously disclosed, to include human subjects, and he explained this to the Vice President. Now convinced that Carol's expressed concerns are plausible, Pearson informs Frank Summers—the head of the Secret Service detail assigned to the White House—of the plot, and his suspicion that Selby is actually an impostor, but Summers' team fails to confirm Selby's true identity using forensic science.

Prior to a planned summit meeting, the leader of the Asian government confers with his impostor at the White House, wherein the Asian reveals to Selby the second phase of his conspiracy—to replace various cabinet members (Labor, etc.) and numerous private industry chief executives (banking, broadcast and print media, oil, steel, etc.) in order to complete his takeover of America.

When Selby arranges a second attempt at replacing the Vice President, the conspirators, including the Vice President's doppelgänger, are captured, brought before the President and numerous invited guests during a state reception, and, along with Selby, are publicly exposed, with the real Pearson placing the doppelgänger Selby under arrest, charging him with murder (of the real Selby) and conspiring to overthrow the United States government.

Summers proposes an armed response against the Asian government, but Pearson, now as President, declines.

Closing narration

Cast

Notes
 The plot bears some similarity to that of the novel The Manchurian Candidate by Richard Condon and the 1962 film adaptation starring Frank Sinatra.  There are also similarities to Black Dragons (1942) starring Bela Lugosi.
 The episode was featured in the film Mrs. Doubtfire  (1993). The kids were watching this episode before Mrs. Doubtfire arrived at the Hillard residence, at about 36 minutes into the film.
 Selby is missing half of the third finger of his left hand. Actor Sidney Blackmer starred in the film, Third Finger, Left Hand (1940).

External links
 

The Outer Limits (1963 TV series season 1) episodes
1963 American television episodes
Television episodes about assassinations
Television episodes about elections
United States presidential succession in fiction